Angel Sar also known as Angelus or Angel Peak  is a  high mountain in the Baltoro Muztagh range of Gilgit–Baltistan, Pakistan. The peak is on the southwest ridge of K2, the second highest mountain on Earth.  The mountain was first climbed on 9 August 1984 by Michel Afanassieff and Claude Stucki.

References

Mountains of Gilgit-Baltistan
Six-thousanders of the Karakoram